Clarke University is a private Roman Catholic university in Dubuque, Iowa. The campus is on a bluff overlooking the Mississippi River and downtown Dubuque. Clarke offers a broad undergraduate curriculum in 19 academic departments with over 40 majors and programs.  The university also provides graduate master's and doctoral degrees in select areas of study and has a general enrollment of approximately 1,200 students.

History

What is now known as Clarke University was established in 1843 as St. Mary's Female Academy by Irish emigrant Mother Mary Frances Clarke, the founder of the Sisters of Charity of the Blessed Virgin Mary.  It was one of the first such schools for women built west of the Mississippi River.

In 1881, St. Mary's moved to its present location atop Dubuque's Seminary Hill (Clarke Drive) and was renamed Mount St. Joseph Academy and College. The college became a liberal arts school in 1901, and the first bachelor's degree was awarded in 1904. In 1910, Mt. St. Joseph was chartered by the state of Iowa, becoming a four-year college by 1913. The North Central Association of Colleges and Secondary Schools accredited Mount St. Joseph in 1918. The academy portion of the school closed in 1928 and the college was renamed Clarke College to honor Mother Mary Frances Clarke and her vision for the college written in 1884 to her community of sisters, almost all of whom were instructors: "Let us…keep our schools progressive with the times in which we live…In teaching, we must…endeavor to make [students] think."

In 1964, Clarke began a graduate program, with the first master's degrees awarded in 1967.  The college was the first small college in the United States to offer a program in Computer Science, also in 1964.  Although Clarke College had been an all-female school since its founding, it became a coeducational institution in early 1979.

On May 17, 1984, the school experienced a disastrous fire that destroyed four of its main buildings, including the Sacred Heart Chapel. The next day, students hung a large banner reading "Clarke Lives!" on the campus to show solidarity following the disaster. Soon after, the school launched a major reconstruction project to replace the destroyed buildings. By 1986, a new library, music performance hall, chapel, bookstore, administrative offices, and central atrium were dedicated. The massive, glass-enclosed Wahlert Atrium built following the fire has since become the main symbol of the school.

Joanne Burrows, (SC) began her term as president on July 1, 2006, replacing the long-serving Sister Catherine Dunn, BVM.  On May 12, 2010, she announced that the college would be renamed Clarke University.  She was succeeded by Thom Chesney in 2019.

Campus
Clarke sits on an intimate  campus located atop a prominent hill in Dubuque. The college consists of 16 buildings, an athletic field, and features large, grassy knolls along the south and east sides of campus for areas of study and recreation.  The grounds are bounded by West Locust Street on the south, Clarke Crest Court on the north, Clarke Crest Drive on the east, and North Grandview Avenue on the west.  Clarke Drive is the "main street" through the campus, bisecting it into "north" and "south" sides. Of Clarke's 16 buildings, 15 are located along Clarke Drive, making it a very walkable campus.

Notable buildings

Wahlert Atrium
The Wahlert Atrium is the main building of the campus and is depicted in much of the graphic art associated with the college. It was built in 1986, following the fire which destroyed four main buildings on the south end of the campus. It is made of glass and steel, with inner rooms framed by brick walls. From the Atrium, one can access any of the other buildings on the south side of the campus. The Atrium holds classrooms for art and music, as well as the Jansen Music Hall (recital hall on campus), the library, Sacred Heart Chapel, administrative offices, and the switchboard.

Catherine Byrne Hall
Catherine Byrne Hall is the main hall of classrooms for the university. Many faculty offices are located in this hall, including a number of those faculty teaching in the fields of mathematics, sciences, and business. In addition to a number of classrooms, there are a number of rooms designated for laboratory teaching in the physics, chemistry, and biology fields. There is a cadaver laboratory in the basement, as well as a planetarium on the top floor. Catherine Byrne Hall is generally regarded as only one of two major halls that is colloquially mentioned by its initials.

Eliza Kelly Hall
Eliza Kelly Hall is one of the three remaining buildings on the campus that have survived from the origination of the college to the present day. It houses offices of faculty that teach in the music, art, drama and musical theatre, and communication departments. There are also a number of practice rooms for music students to use at their convenience. Colloquially, students refer to the hall as "Eliza Kelly".  In Dubuque, Clarke was known as the "College for the Arts", although the university announced in December 2018 that Drama and Musical Theater would no longer be offered as a major, and that the BFA was being discontinued. Despite this, the faculty of the Visual and Performing Arts Department remains impressive.  The art faculty consists of Eric Wold (graphic design), Louise Kames (printmaking), Jessica Rebik (painting/drawing), and Jessica Teckemeyer (sculpture/ceramics).  The faculty of the drama and musical theatre programs include Ellen Gabrielleschi (designer), Nick Halder (director, theatre history and literature), and Joe Klinebriel (director, actor, voice and movement).

Mary Benedict Hall
Mary Benedict Hall is the female underclass dormitory of the university. A number of upperclass women also live here, at their discretion. It is a five-floor building with a basement that holds a hallway linking it to the rest of the southern side of campus. In addition to student dormitories, there is a recreational center in the basement (known as the "Lions Den"), and apartments for visitors on the ground floor of the building. Most of the students refer to the building colloquially as "Mary Ben."

Mary Frances Hall

Mary Frances Hall is the co-ed upperclass dormitory of the university. It is reserved for juniors and seniors who maintain a grade point average (GPA) of 2.5 or better. It is one of two buildings in the college where students may possess alcohol, and then only students over 21 may have it legally in their rooms. It is one of the three "original" buildings still remaining from the origination of the college. It is a four-story building with a central complex extending into western and eastern wings. The first and second floors are reserved for female students, with the third floor reserved for male students. The fourth floor is used for storage, and is generally thought to be haunted. The legend that floats about campus is of a nun hanging herself in her room with the blood oozing onto the floor, which reappears each time the floor has been cleaned. Also, there had been an etching on the window that is sometimes visible from the outside which reads, "Help Me".  When fewer students occupy this building, paranormal activity increases.

Mary Frances Hall is colloquially called "Mary Fran".

Mary Josita Hall
Mary Josita Hall is the male underclass dormitory of the university. It is four stories tall, with a basement hallway linking it to Mary Benedict Hall. There are also some campus offices in the basement of Mary Josita Hall, including the main security office and the main Residence Life office. The main dining hall is also located in the basement of the building. The first floor is reserved for offices of faculty that teach in the humanities, philosophy, social sciences, political sciences, and history departments. The configuration of the next three stories has varied from year to year based upon enrollment and students electing to live on campus, but generally the majority of residents in Mary Josita Hall are male.

Robert & Ruth Kehl Center
The Kehl Center is the main athletic and social area of the university. There are two main sections of the center – the arena area and surrounding offices, and the "Student Activity Center" which includes the student union and some student life offices. The arena area of the Kehl Center includes an indoor track, a competition basketball court (with three intramural basketball courts overlapping the main court), two racquetball courts (one filled with cardio equipment), one newly designed weight room, and locker room facilities. In the Student Activity Center, there is a game room, the Whitlow Bookstore, the Crusader Cafe (an alternative to the main dining hall set up in the fashion of a fast-food grill), the Mail Center, and a stage for entertainment. The Kehl Center Arena was constructed in 1997, with the SAC being added on to the main building in 2000.

Terence Donaghoe Hall
Terence Donaghoe Hall is the main hall for theatre productions at the college. The drama department generally produces four mainstage productions each year (two per semester). It is a proscenium stage design with a main floor and balcony seating. The theater has a capacity of approximately 600 people. Terence Donaghoe Hall is the third "original" building to have survived to present day.

Athletics 
The Clarke athletic teams are called the Pride. The university is a member of the National Association of Intercollegiate Athletics (NAIA), primarily competing in the Heart of America Athletic Conference (HAAC) since the 2016–17 academic year, after spending a season as an NAIA Independent within the Association of Independent Institutions (AII) during the 2015–16 school year (as well as during the 2006–07 school year when the school re-joined the NAIA). The Pride previously competed in the defunct Midwest Collegiate Conference (MCC) from 2007–08 to 2014–15 (when the conference dissolved), which they were a member on a previous stint from 1988–89 to 1995–96. Clarke was also a member of the defunct Northern Illinois-Iowa Conference (NIIC) of the NCAA Division III ranks from 1996–97 to 2005–06.

Clarke competes in 21 intercollegiate varsity sports: Men's sports include baseball, basketball, bowling, cross country, football, golf, lacrosse, soccer, track & field and volleyball; while women's sports include basketball, bowling, cross country, golf, lacrosse, soccer, softball, track & field and volleyball; and co-ed sports include cheerleading, dance and eSports.

Clarke University women's basketball team was the 2022-23 NAIA national champion, defeating defending champion Thomas Moore University 63-52.

Nickname 
A name change in 2017 due to negative connotations of "Crusaders" resulted in the new nickname as the "Pride"; which the name refers to the term for a pack of lions.

Notable alumni and staff 
 Nancy Dickerson – pioneering television newswoman, attended Clarke
 Margaret Feldner – first female president of Quincy University, former head of the education department at Clarke
 Luke Flynn - musician and film composer, attended Clarke (BA in Music Composition)
 Ruth Ann Gaines – Democratic Iowa State Representative, attended Clarke (BA in drama/speech)
 Sister Mary Kenneth Keller – nun and computer science pioneer. The first woman in the U.S. to receive a PhD in Computer Science, founded the computer science department at Clarke and headed the department for 20 years
 Barbara Larkin – United States Assistant Secretary of State for Legislative Affairs, attended Clarke (BA 1973)
 George R. R. Martin – Game of Thrones writer; taught English and journalism at Clarke
 Karen Morrow – musical theater actress/singer, attended Clarke
 Adam Rapp – novelist/playwright, attended Clarke
 Peggy Sullivan – library consultant specializing in executive searches, attended Clarke (BA 1950)

See also
 Dubuque, Iowa
 Roman Catholic Archdiocese of Dubuque

References

External links
 
 Official athletics website

 
Education in Dubuque, Iowa
Roman Catholic Archdiocese of Dubuque
Liberal arts colleges in Iowa
Educational institutions established in 1843
Former women's universities and colleges in the United States
Buildings and structures in Dubuque, Iowa
Tourist attractions in Dubuque, Iowa
Catholic universities and colleges in Iowa
1843 establishments in Iowa Territory